Platycerus hongwonpyoi is a species of stag beetle, from the Lucinidae family and Lucaninae subfamily. It was discovered in Korea by Imura and Choe in 1989.

The species has numerous sub-species, including:
 Platycerus hongwonpyoi dabashanensis (Okuda, 1997)
 Platycerus hongwonpyoi funiuensis (Imura, 2005)
 Platycerus hongwonpyoi merkli (Imura & Choe, 1989)
 Platycerus hongwonpyoi mongolicus (Imura & Bartolozzi, 2006)
 Platycerus hongwonpyoi quanbaoshanus (Imura, 2011)
 Platycerus hongwonpyoi quinlingensis (Imura, 1993)
 Platycerus hongwonpyoi shennongjianus (Imura, 2008)

References 

Beetles described in 1989
Lucanidae
Insects of Korea